Ajdin Drina (born 22 March 2004) is a Bosnian professional footballer who plays as a midfielder for Bosnian Premier League club Velež Mostar.

Club career

Velež Mostar
On 29 November 2021, Drina signed a contract with Velež Mostar until 2026. In December 2021, he made his debut against hometown club Sarajevo.

Loan to Jedinstvo Bihać
In August 2022, Drina was sent on loan to Jedinstvo Bihać until the end of the calendar year.

Career statistics

Club

Honours
Velež Mostar
Bosnian Cup: 2021–22

References

2004 births
Living people
Footballers from Sarajevo
Bosnia and Herzegovina footballers
Association football midfielders
FK Velež Mostar players
NK Jedinstvo Bihać players
Premier League of Bosnia and Herzegovina players
First League of the Federation of Bosnia and Herzegovina players